The Médanos Isthmus is a sandy isthmus in Venezuela that connects the Paraguaná Peninsula with the rest of Falcón State. The isthmus is approximately 6 km (3.73 miles) wide and 27 km (16.78 miles) long. It is the site of the Médanos de Coro National Park.

The isthmus is in the Paraguana xeric scrub ecoregion.

References

External links
Medanos isthums on iTouchMap

Isthmuses of South America
Geography of Falcón